The 1981 Florida State Seminoles football team represented Florida State University in the 1981 NCAA Division I-A football season. The team was coached by Bobby Bowden and played their home games at Doak Campbell Stadium.

Schedule

Personnel

Season summary
Florida State finished with a 6–5 record and were not invited to a Bowl game. The Seminoles' offense scored 240 points while the defense allowed 286 points. The Seminoles played a murderers row schedule on the road, as in consecutive weeks, they played at #17 Nebraska, at #7 Ohio State, at Notre Dame, at #3 Pittsburgh and at LSU.
Greg Allen led the team in rushing with 888 yards. Rick Stockstill led the team in passing with 1356 yards and 11 touchdown passes. Michael Whiting led the team in receptions with 29. Phil Williams led the team in receiving yards with 413. Harvey Clayton led the team with 5 pass interceptions.
Jarvis Coursey {DE}, Tim McCormick {C}, Rohn Stark {P} and Barry Voltapetti {OT} were selected to the First team All-South Independent team. Rohn Stark was selected as a First team All-American. Greg Allen {RB}, Garry Futch {G}, McCormick and Voltapetti were named as Honorable Mention All-Americans by the Associated Press. Stark {Baltimore Colts}, Ron Hester {LB}, {Miami} and Mike Whiting {RB} {Dallas} were selected in the 1982 NFL draft.

Louisville
Florida State eked out a 17–0 victory over Louisville, but it wasn't easy. Frustrated throughout by a Louisville defense led by tackle Richard Tharpe, the Seminoles staggered and stumbled most of the way. Four times Tharpe got through and sacked quarterback Rick Stockstill. It was 10-0 after the first quarter, as Mike Rendina kicked a 24-yard field goal and Stockstill hit Jessie Hester with an 11-yard scoring pass. With seven minutes left, Billy Allen broke away on a pitchout for a 50-yard scoring run to ice it. Allen ran the ball eight times for 89 yards. Louisville threatened numerous times only to be denied by the Seminole defense. FSU held the Cardinals to 133 yards of total offense.

Memphis State
Florida State's offense managed to get a touchdown and a field goal on the board. Memphis State stayed in it to the end before falling 10–5. Late in the 1st quarter the Seminoles moved on a 77-yard drive for the only touchdown that came on Mike Whiting's 3 yard run in the first moments of the 2nd quarter. That erased a 2–0 deficit, which came when Rick Stockstill was trapped in the end zone by Cedric Wright on FSU's second series of the evening. Early in the 4th quarter Mike Rendina kicked a 46-yard field goal to make it 10–2. A few minutes later Gregg Hauss put through a 27 yarder for 3 points and the final score. Larry Harris intercepted a pass with 4 seconds remaining, did the Seminoles have this one wrapped up.

at Nebraska
Nebraska held a close 10–7 lead at halftime, but the momentum quickly turned in favor of the Cornhuskers when WB Irving Fryar scored on an 82-yard punt return, followed up six game clock seconds later when DE Tony Felici's off-the-bench opportunity allowed him to recover a Florida State fumble on the kickoff and return it 13 yards for another touchdown. Nebraska sealed the deal on a 94-yard touchdown run by IB Roger Craig.

Ohio State
The Seminoles knocked #7 Ohio State from the unbeaten ranks 36–27. Rick Stockstill completed 25 of 41 passes for 299 yards and two touchdowns. Stockstill directed two third quarter drives to touchdowns that were the difference. The first covered 88 yards in 11 plays, the second 99 in nine. The Seminoles increased their 23-21 halftime lead as a result of these drives. No bigger play was Ron Hester's blocked punt that he returned 35 yards for a touchdown in the 2nd quarter. Stockstill's TD passes were to Tony Johnson (13 yards) and Sam Childers (7 yards). Kelly Lowery and Ricky Williams had touchdown runs for the Seminoles.

at Notre Dame
Florida State Seminoles, in their first ever visit to Notre Dame Stadium, left with a 19–13 victory. Mike Rendina kicked two field goals and Michael Whiting scored both the Seminoles touchdowns, a 17-yard pass from Rick Stockstill and a 5-yard pass from Stockstill. Ricky Williams ran for 135 yards. Stockstill passed for only 100 yards but his two TD passes were the difference in the game.

at Pittsburgh
3 ranked Pittsburgh dominated every phase of the game and routed Florida State 42-14 before a crowd of 55,112 at Pitt Stadium. Pitt's Dan Marino, threw for 215 yards and touchdowns of 22, 65, and 18 yards. Michael Whiting ran 1 yard for a touchdown and Sam Childers caught a 5-yard TD pass from Blair Williams. Pittsburgh rolled up 503 yards of total offense.

at LSU
Florida State crushed Louisiana State 38-14 before over 74,000 homecoming fans at Tiger Stadium. Offense, defense and special teams all contributed in the rout. Harvey Clayton had an interception and a 48-yard punt return. James Harris had 3 sacks, Warren Hanna blocked a punt and Billy Allen returned a kickoff 97 yards for a touchdown. Greg Allen and Cedric Jones ran for touchdowns. Allen rushed for 202 yards, a new school record. Rick Stockstill passed for two touchdowns, one to Dennis McKinnon (22 yards) and one to Phil Williams (12 yards).

Western Carolina
A homecoming crowd of over 52,000 at Doak Campbell Stadium was treated to an offensive show by both squads. It featured 623 yards of total offense by the Seminoles and 437 yards by Western Carolina. Greg Allen's 322 yards of rushing on 32 carries was the single-game best in college football this season, and shattered his own FSU record of 202 yards that be set a week ago at LSU. Allen had a 5-yard touchdown run and a 95-yard kickoff return for a touchdown. Michael Whiting ran for two touchdowns and Mike Rendina kicked two field goals. Dennis McKinnon, Tony Johnson and Cedric Jones had touchdowns for the Seminoles.

Miami (FL)
The Seminole kicking game was missing as they had two field goal attempts and an extra point blocked. The Noles and the Canes were tied 13-13 heading into the 4th quarter. Smokey Roan scored from 6 yards out for a 20-13 Hurricane lead. The Seminoles still had 10:47 left to come back, but two plays later Rick Stockstill's slant pass was tipped and intercepted by Ronnie Tippett. Jim Kelly threw to Speedy Neal and broke two tackles on the way to the end zone for a 27–13 lead with 8:54 left. The Seminoles closed to 27–19 on a Stockstill 7 yard TD pass to Sam Childers.

The loss snapped Florida State's 19-game home winning streak.

Southern Mississippi
Florida State crashed and burned before 51,819 spectators at Doak Campbell Stadium. Southern Miss did whatever they pleased in a 58–14 rout and moved to 9-0-1 on the season. The Seminoles trailed 51-0 before they finally got on the scoreboard with a Dennis McKinnon 50 yard TD reception from Blair Williams. Tom Wheeler caught a 6-yard TD pass from Williams to close out the scoring for the game.

at Florida
Florida took a 13–3 lead into halftime and then poured it on in the 2nd half on the way to a 35–3 victory over the Seminoles. Wayne Peace threw four touchdown passes, including two to Mike Mularkey. Brian Clark added two field goals for the Gators. The Gators dominated the game from the opening drive to the final gun and won for the first time over Florida State since 1976.

References

Florida State
Florida State Seminoles football seasons
Florida State Seminoles football